Michael Swain(e) may refer to:

Michael D. Swaine (born 1951), American author and expert in China security studies and senior associate at the Carnegie Endowment for International Peace
Michael Swaine (technical author), American technical author and co-author of book which inspired movie Pirates of Silicon Valley
Michael Swaine (artist), Futurefarmers artist and activist
Mike Swain (born 1960), judoka